Paul Svarstad (6 March 1917 – 3 April 1998) was a Norwegian politician for the Conservative Party.

He was born in Innvik.

He was elected to the Norwegian Parliament from Sogn og Fjordane in 1965, and was re-elected on one occasion.

Svarstad was involved in local politics in Innvik and its successor municipality Stryn between 1952 and 1979, serving as deputy mayor of Innvik in the periods 1956–1959, 1959–1963, 1963–1964 and mayor of Stryn in 1975–1976.

He had been a part of Milorg in 1943–1945.

See also
Politics of Norway

References

1917 births
1998 deaths
Conservative Party (Norway) politicians
Members of the Storting
20th-century Norwegian politicians